UDP-4-amino-4,6-dideoxy-N-acetyl-alpha-D-glucosamine N-acetyltransferase (PGLD) is an enzyme with systematic name acetyl-CoA:UDP-4-amino-4,6-dideoxy-N-acetyl-alpha-D-glucosamine N-acetyltransferase. This enzyme catalyses the following chemical reaction

 acetyl-CoA + UDP-4-amino-4,6-dideoxy-N-acetyl-alpha-D-glucosamine  CoA + UDP-N,N'-diacetylbacillosamine

UDP-N,N'-diacetylbacillosamine is an intermediate in protein glycosylation pathways in several bacterial species.

References

External links 
 

EC 2.3.1